is a former Japanese football player.

Playing career
Fukagawa was born in Muroran on July 24, 1972. After graduating from Kokushikan University, he joined newly was promoted to J1 League club, Cerezo Osaka in 1995. He played many matches as forward from first season. In 1998, he moved to newly was promoted to J1 League club, Consadole Sapporo based in his local. Although he played many matches until 1999, his opportunity to play decreased for injury from 2000. In 2002, he moved to Mito HollyHock. He retired end of 2002 season.

Club statistics

References

External links

1972 births
Living people
Kokushikan University alumni
Association football people from Hokkaido
Japanese footballers
J1 League players
J2 League players
Cerezo Osaka players
Hokkaido Consadole Sapporo players
Mito HollyHock players
Association football forwards
People from Muroran, Hokkaido